Pedro Miguel Neves Guerreiro (born 25 February 1966, Lisbon) is a Portuguese politician and Member of the European Parliament for the Portuguese Communist Party, part of the European United Left - Nordic Green Left group. He took his seat in the European Parliament on 13 January 2005, replacing Sérgio Ribeiro of the same party.

References

Portuguese Communist Party politicians
1966 births
Living people
Portuguese Communist Party MEPs
MEPs for Portugal 2004–2009